Taitung County (Paiwan: Valangaw;lit:Eastern part of Taiwan) is the third largest county in Taiwan Province, Republic of China, located primarily on the island's southeastern coast and also including Green Island, Orchid Island and Lesser Orchid Island. The seat is located in Taitung City.

Name
While its name means "Eastern Taiwan", it is also known as "Houshan" by many of the locals, meaning behind the mountains or the back mountains.

History

Qing Dynasty
In 1887, the new Fujian-Taiwan Province included Taitung Prefecture as one of four prefectures.

Empire of Japan

During the Japanese rule of Taiwan, Taitung County was administered as Taitō Prefecture.

Republic of China
After the handover of Taiwan from Japan to the Republic of China on 25 October 1945, Taitung was established as a county of Taiwan Province on 25 December the same year.

Geography

Taitung runs along the south east coast of Taiwan. Taitung county, controlling  is the 3rd largest county in Taiwan after Hualien County and Nantou County. The Huatung Valley runs along the northern half of the county. Taitung currently has a population of 234,123.

Due in part to its remote location and isolation by mountains from Taiwan's main population centers, Taitung was the last part of the island to be colonized by Han Chinese immigrants (late 19th century). Throughout the 20th century Taitung remained an economic backwater. Sparsely populated even today, this isolation may have been a blessing in disguise, as Taitung mostly escaped the urbanization and pollution that have come to plague much of the island's lowland areas.

In addition to the area on Taiwan proper, the county includes two major islands, Green Island or Isla Verde and Orchid Island. Green Island was home to an infamous penal colony used for political prisoners during the "White Terror" period of Chinese Nationalist (KMT) rule (from 1947 until the end of martial law in 1987). Orchid Island, home of the Tao people (Taiwanese aborigines closely related to the people of the northern Philippines), has become a major tourist attraction despite the government-operated Taiwan Power Company's controversial use of part of the island as a nuclear waste dump.

Government

Administrative divisions
Taitung County is divided into 1 city, 2 urban townships, 8 rural townships and 5 mountain indigenous townships. Taitung County has the second highest number of mountain indigenous townships in Taiwan after Pingtung County. The seat of the county is located at Taitung City, where it houses the Taitung County Government and Taitung County Council. The current Magistrate of Taitung County is Rao Ching-ling of the Kuomintang. After streamlining of Taiwan Province in 1998, the county has since  directly governed by the Executive Yuan.

Colors indicates the common languages status of Hakka and Formosan languages within each division.

Politics
Taitung County elected one Democratic Progressive Party legislator to the Legislative Yuan during the 2016 Republic of China legislative election.

Demographics

Taitung County is home to seven aboriginal ethnics, including Amis, Bunun, Kavalan, Paiwan, Puyuma, Rukai and Yami. Taitung County has the largest aboriginal to overall population of a county or city in Taiwan, at 35.5%.

Education
Education in Taitung County is administered under the Education Department of the Taitung County Government.
 National Taitung University
 National Taitung Junior College

Culture
Taitung County possesses a very diverse collection of aboriginal cultures. Because Taitung is probably one of the least affected counties by the settlement of the Han Chinese, most of the aboriginal cultures are still very much a part of everyday society.

Energy
Taitung County houses the Lanyu Power Plant, a 6.5 MW fuel-fired power plant located in Orchid Island.

Tourist attractions

Buildings
Duoliang Station, Kunci Temple, Lüdao Lighthouse, Moving Castle and Taitung Chinese Association.

Historical sites
Beinan Cultural Park, Dulan Site and Green Island White Terror Memorial Park.

Museums and galleries
Lanyu Flying Fish Cultural Museum, National Museum of Prehistory, Rice Village Museum, Taitung Aboriginal Gallery, Taitung Art Museum, Taitung County Museum of Natural History, Taitung Performing Art Center, Taitung Story Museum, Wu Tao Chishang Lunch Box Cultural History Museum.

Nature
Baxian Caves, Chulu Ranch, Dapo Pond, Dulan Mountain, Green Island, Jhihben National Forest Recreation Area, Orchid Island, Sanxiantai, Sika Deer Ecological Park, Taitung Forest Park, Xiangyang National Forest Recreation Area and Zhaori Hot Spring.

Theme parks
Bunun Tribal Leisure Farm

Transportation

Air
Taitung County houses the international Taitung Airport in the mainland Taitung County of Taitung City and another two airports at the outlying islands, which are Lüdao Airport in Green Island and Lanyu Airport in Orchid Island.

Rail
Taitung County is crossed by two Taiwan Railways Administration lines of South-Link Line and Hualien–Taitung Line. The stations consist of Chishang, Dawu, Guanshan, Guzhuang, Haiduan, Jinlun, Kangle, Longxi, Luye, Ruihe, Ruiyuan, Shanli, Taimali, Taitung and Zhiben Station.

Water
Chenggong Fish Harbor, Fugang Fishery Harbor and Green Island Nanliao Harbor.

Notable natives
 Yu Chang, Major League Baseball player
 Yang Chuan-kwang, 1960 Summer Olympics decathlon medalist
 Tank, singer
 A-Mei, singer

Relative location

Notes

References

External links

Taitung County Government Website